The men's 400 metres hurdles at the 1978 European Athletics Championships was held in Prague, then Czechoslovakia, at Stadion Evžena Rošického on 29, 30, and 31 August 1978.

Medalists

Results

Final
31 August

Semi-finals
30 August

Semi-final 1

Semi-final 2

Heats
29 August

Heat 1

Heat 2

Heat 3

Heat 4

Participation
According to an unofficial count, 27 athletes from 16 countries participated in the event.

 (1)
 (1)
 (2)
 (1)
 (2)
 (2)
 (1)
 (1)
 (1)
 (3)
 (1)
 (2)
 (2)
 (3)
 (3)
 (1)

References

400 metres hurdles
400 metres hurdles at the European Athletics Championships